Candrasinh Jadeja (born 1970) is an Indian educator. He became the third chancellor of Krantiguru Shyamji Krishna Verma Kachchh University on January 3, 2016. He was associated to Shri A.R.S. Sakhida Arts, C.C. Gediwala Commerce and C.C. Home Science College, Limbdi in the capacity of Associate Professor of Psychology and an in-charge principal of Ratanmama College of Computer Science. He was born in Mandvi Kojachora.

References 

1970 births
Living people
Heads of universities and colleges in India
Place of birth missing (living people)